The men's 4 × 400 metres relay event at the 2002 Commonwealth Games was held on July 30–31.

In the final, Michael Blackwood of Jamaica was in the leading position when coming into the final stretch. He, however, dropped his baton when being overtaken by Matthew Elias from Wales and ultimately finished the race in fourth without a baton, which isn't allowed. England and Wales fought it out to the finishing line with England coming narrowly on top.

Medalists

* Athletes who competed in heats only and received medals.

Results

Heats
Qualification: First 3 teams of each heat (Q) plus the next 2 fastest (q) qualified for the final.

Final

References
Official results
Results at BBC

Relay
2002